300 m rifle three positions (formerly known as one of four free rifle disciplines) is an ISSF shooting event, involving shooting 40 shots each from the prone, the standing and the kneeling positions. Men and women both shoot the same number of shots, though previously women only shot half the course – or 20 shots in each position.

Originally there had been champions declared in each position based on the results of the 40 shots in the three position match. A special 300 metre rifle prone match was added in 1982 however, after a pattern from the so-called English Match. After 1990, no World Championship medals have been awarded in the standing or kneeling position.

History
300 m rifle has been a declining event for many decades because of the considerable cost for competing in the event and the difficulty of creating ranges for it. The Olympic status was dropped in the 1970s, making 50 metre rifle the only rifle event on the program (10 metre air rifle was later added), it was in the Olympic program from 1900 to 1972. 300 m Rifle is still on the World and regional championships program, though.

Both men and women use the same rifle in this event, which has a weight limit of 8.0 kg. This rifle is not the same as the one used in the standard rifle 300m event, which has a lower weight limit of 5.5 kg, a minimum trigger pull of 1500g, and other restrictions regarding barrel length, and allowed accessories such as palm rests. The maximum caliber of ammunition is 8 mm, though the 6mm BR is most commonly used.

The 300 m rifle three positions event is part of the European Shooting Championships. The most recent was held in September 2019 in Tolmezzo, Italy.

World Championships, Men

World Championships, Men Team

World Championships, Women

World Championships, Women Team

World Championships, total medals

Note that at the 1923 World Championship, only the gold medal was awarded in the team event.

European Championships
The European Championships of this discipline were contested eleven times from 1959 through 1999.

Current world records

See also
 European 300 m Rifle Championships
 European Shooting Confederation
 International Shooting Sport Federation
 ISSF shooting events

References

External links
 

ISSF shooting events
Rifle shooting sports

ko:300미터 소총
no:300 m rifle